The Santa Clause is a media franchise that consists of three American holiday family-comedy theatrical feature films starring Tim Allen, and one limited series for Disney+. Based on an original story by Leo Benvenuti and Steve Rudnick, the plot centers around Scott Calvin's transformation into Santa Claus, and his adventures thereafter. 

The Santa Clause was met with mostly positive critical reviews, and was a box office success. In the years since its release, it has earned its status as a Christmas classic. The sequels experienced diminishing critical reception, but were still financial successes and are also now considered holiday cult classics.

The franchise continued with a television series, The Santa Clauses, which premiered on November 16, 2022.

Films

The Santa Clause (1994)

Divorced dad Scott Calvin (Tim Allen) has custody of his son Charlie (Eric Lloyd) on Christmas Eve. After he accidentally causes the death of Santa, they are magically transported to the North Pole, where an elf explains that Scott must take Santa's place before the next Christmas arrives. Scott thinks he's dreaming, but over the next several months he gains weight and grows an inexplicably white beard. Realizing that it wasn't a dream, Scott embraces the new, permanent role he has as Santa Claus.

The Santa Clause 2 (2002)

Scott Calvin (Tim Allen) has been in the role of Santa for the past eight years, and his loyal elves consider him the best one ever. But the world of the "Merry Old Soul" turns upside down when he's dealt a double whammy of news: Not only has his son, Charlie (Eric Lloyd), landed on this year's naughty list, but Scott discovers that he must marry by Christmas Eve, or he will stop being Santa Claus forever.

The Santa Clause 3: The Escape Clause (2006)

Christmas cheer turns into holiday chaos when Scott Calvin / Santa Claus (Tim Allen) invites his in-laws (Ann-Margret, Alan Arkin) for a visit and must also contend with Jack Frost's (Martin Short) scheme to take over the North Pole. Scott, his family, and Head Elf Curtis (Spencer Breslin) must join forces to foil the nefarious plot.

Short film

True Confessions of the Legendary Figures (2003)
Released on The Santa Clause 2 home media, the 3 minutes 30 second short film is a mockumentary interview with Father Time, Easter Bunny, Tooth Fairy, Cupid, Sandman and Mother Nature. The actors reprised their roles from the film.

Television 

In January 2022, it was announced that a sequel limited series was in development. Jack Burditt will serve as showrunner and executive producer, while Tim Allen and Elizabeth Mitchell will reprise their roles as Scott Calvin / Santa Clause and Carol Newman-Calvin / Mrs. Claus, respectively. Allen, Kevin Hench, Richard Baker and Rick Messina will serve as additional executive producers. The project will be a joint-venture production between Disney Branded Television, 20th Television, Disney Television Studios, and Disney+ Original Series. The show is intended to be released via streaming exclusively on Disney+. Production is scheduled to commence in March 2022 in Los Angeles, California. At the beginning of that month, Jason Winer was announced as the director.

The official premise of the series was announced as:

In March 2022, Kal Penn was cast in the series as a character named Simon Choski. While Penn's character has not officially been identified as Allen's character's successor, the initials of his character's name are "S.C.", the same as Scott Calvin and Santa Claus. The Santa Clauses was renewed for a second season on December 14, 2022, with Tim Allen and Elizabeth Mitchell set to return.

Main cast and characters

Additional crew and production details

Reception

Box office performance

The Santa Clause 2 on its opening weekend grossed  more than its predecessor. The opening weekend was a personal best to date for Tim Allen. The Hollywood Reporter said its performance "exceeded expectations". The Santa Clause strongest market outside the United States was Germany, and The Santa Clause 2 had in Germany an opening weekend of $892,000, which was 50% larger than the opening weekend of the original film.

Box Office Mojo reported: "More often than not, second sequels in the family genre make significantly less than their predecessors". After  in theaters, the third film had grossed , which Box Office Mojo said was "lagging behind its predecessors by a wide margin".

Critical and public response

Scott Foundas of Variety called the 1994 film was "a full-on charmer pic". Foundas said the 2002 follow-up had too many writers and executives involved during the long development process, which he said led to "systematically pulverizing most of the original's simple delights". The critic said: "The Santa Clause 2 is a movie conscious, at every waking moment, of trying to out-do its predecessor". Varietys Justin Chang said The Santa Clause 3 was "a much cleaner, more streamlined ride than its overstuffed predecessor". Chang said: "Michael Lembeck directs the action with a surer touch and more consistent tone than he brought to Santa Clause 2, and effortlessly pulls off the pic's sentimental, life-affirming moments without tugging too hard".

See also
 List of Christmas films
 Santa Claus in film

References

External links 
 

Comedy film series
Santa Claus in film
Walt Disney Studios (division) franchises
Children's film series
Film series introduced in 1994
Trilogies
The Santa Clause (franchise)
Films adapted into television shows